Origes is a genus of South American huntsman spiders that was first described by Eugène Louis Simon in 1897.  it contains three species, found in Ecuador, Peru, and Argentina: O. chloroticus, O. nigrovittatus, and O. pollens. O. chloroticus may be misplaced in this genus and family.

See also
 List of Sparassidae species

References

Araneomorphae genera
Sparassidae
Spiders of South America